Roccaforte may refer to several Italian municipalities:

Roccaforte del Greco, in the province of Reggio Calabria
Roccaforte Ligure, in the province of Alessandria
Roccaforte Mondovì, in the province of Cuneo